Events in the year 2017 in Brazil.

Incumbents

Federal government 
 President: Michel Temer 
 Vice president: vacant

Governors
 Acre: Tião Viana 
 Alagoas: Renan Filho
 Amapa: Waldez Góes
 Amazonas: 
 until 9 May: José Melo 
 9 May-4 October: David Almeida 
 starting 4 October: Amazonino Mendes
 Bahia: Rui Costa
 Ceará: Camilo Santana
 Espírito Santo: Paulo Hartung
 Goiás: Marconi Perillo
 Maranhão: Flávio Dino
 Mato Grosso: Pedro Taques
 Mato Grosso do Sul: Reinaldo Azambuja
 Minas Gerais: Fernando Damata Pimentel
 Pará: Simão Jatene
 Paraíba: Ricardo Coutinho
 Paraná: Beto Richa
 Pernambuco: Paulo Câmara
 Piauí: Wellington Dias
 Rio de Janeiro: 
 Rio Grande do Norte: Robinson Faria
 Rio Grande do Sul: José Ivo Sartori
 Rondônia: Confúcio Moura
 Roraima: Suely Campos
 Santa Catarina: Raimundo Colombo
 São Paulo: Geraldo Alckmin
 Sergipe: Jackson Barreto
 Tocantins: Marcelo Miranda

Vice governors
 Acre: Maria Nazareth Melo de Araújo Lambert
 Alagoas: José Luciano Barbosa da Silva
 Amapá: João Bosco Papaléo Paes
 Amazonas: José Henrique Oliveira (until 4 October), João Bosco Gomes Saraiva (starting 4 October)
 Bahia: João Leão
 Ceará: Maria Izolda Cela de Arruda Coelho
 Espírito Santo: César Roberto Colnago
 Goiás: José Eliton de Figueiredo Júnior
 Maranhão: Carlos Orleans Brandão Júnior
 Mato Grosso: Carlos Henrique Baqueta Fávaro (until 5 April), vacant thereafter
 Mato Grosso do Sul: Rose Modesto
 Minas Gerais: Antônio Eustáquio Andrade Ferreira
 Pará: José da Cruz Marinho 
 Paraíba: Lígia Feliciano
 Paraná: Maria Aparecida Borghetti (until 6 April), vacant thereafter
 Pernambuco: Raul Jean Louis Henry Júnior
 Piaui: Margarete de Castro Coelho
 Rio de Janeiro: Francisco Dornelles
 Rio Grande do Norte: Fábio Dantas
 Rio Grande do Sul: José Paulo Dornelles Cairoli
 Rondônia: 
 Roraima: Paulo César Justo Quartiero
 Santa Catarina: Eduardo Pinho Moreira
 São Paulo: Márcio França
 Sergipe: Belivaldo Chagas Silva
 Tocantins: Cláudia Telles de Menezes Pires Martins Lelis

Events

January

January 1 
 January 2 – At least 56 people were killed in the 2017 Manaus prison riot at the Anisio Jobim penitentiary complex in Amazonas state.
 January 6 – Members of the Primeiro Comando da Capital (PCP) prison gang saved 31 inmates in the Monte Cristo in the state of Roraima, in revenge for an earlier massacre in Amazonas that saved 56 inmates. |agency=Reuters
 January 13 – Police raid multiple Rio de Janeiro locations in an investigation of Caixa Econômica Federal lending practices.
 January 15
 At least 10 inmates are killed in a prison riot between rival gangs in Natal.
 Another 33 prisoners were killed in a fresh outbreak of violence at Alcacuz prison in Rio Grande state.
 January 19 – A small plane carrying Brazilian Supreme Court Justice Teori Zavascki crashed into the sea near the tourist town of Paraty, Brazil, killing the magistrate and four other people. Zavascki had been handling the politically-charged, Operation Car Wash corruption trials.
 January 21 – Brazilian police enter the Alcacuz prison outside the city of Natal, Rio Grande do Norte after a week of fighting leaves 26 inmates dead. At least 126 people have been killed in Brazil's prisons since the beginning of the year.
 January 30 – Brazilian police arrest EBX Group CEO Eike Batista for allegedly bribing officials in Rio de Janeiro, including former Governor of Rio de Janeiro Sérgio Cabral Filho.

February
February 6 – Brazilian President Michel Temer deployed the Brazilian Army to the southeastern state of Espírito Santo, where a police strike led to a wave of violence and looting, including dozens of murders in the state capital, Vitória.
February 17 - Supreme Court judge Edson Fachin authorized an investigation into efforts to impede the Operation Car Wash kickback investigation. Prosecutor General Rodrigo Janot had accused former President and current Senator José Sarney and Senators Romero Juca and Renan Calheiros of obstruction of justice, citing conversations secretly recorded by cooperating witness Sergio Machado, former head of a unit at Petrobras

March
March 7 -- Economic figures released showing that the Brazilian economy shrank 3.6% in 2016.	
March 16 – SpaceX successfully launches the EchoStar 23 satellite, a Direct-to-home television broadcast services for Brazil, into a geosynchronous transfer orbit, using the fully expendable version of their Falcon 9 launch vehicle.
March 17
 Operation Carne Fraca starts, investigating some of the country's largest meat processing companies.
 Share prices for meatpacker JBS S.A. dropped 10% on the news.
March 25 – China, Chile and Egypt lift their bans on importing meat from Brazil.

April
April 5 - Former Rio state Secretary of Heath Sérgio Côrtes charged with two other people with obstruction of justice for trying to get former under-secretary Cesar Romero to change his testimony in an Operation Car Wash investigation
April 13 – A former Odebrecht executive, jailed for bribery, says that Michel Temer was involved in a scheme to funnel a $40million dollar illegal campaign contribution to his party's campaign fund. Temer denies this.
April 17 – A federal judge orders Petrobras to suspend the sale to Norway's Statoil of its stake in an offshore prospect, in response to the National Federation of Oil Workers' petition there should have been an open bidding process for this transaction.
April 25 – In Paraguay around 50 armed men allegedly belonging to the Brazil-based First Capital Command, storm a security vault and police headquarters in Ciudad del Este, escaping with around $6 million in a daring cross-border raid.
April 28
A nationwide general strike takes place against cuts to social security benefits and changes to labour laws by Michel Temer's government, including plans to raise the retirement age to 65. This is the first general strike in Brazil in twenty years.
Rocha Loures was filmed leaving a pizzeria with 500,000 reis in a carry-on he had received from one of Joesley Batista's executives.
Eike Batista released from prison pending trial by Supreme Court justice Gilmar Mendes. Batista had been charged with making $16.5 million in bribes to the former governor of Rio de Janeiro state.

May
May 11 – The federal government of Brazil informs the World Health Organization that it is ending its state of emergency concerning the Zika virus, following a 95.3% reduction in cases in early 2017 compared to early 2016.
May 17 - O Globo reported it had obtained recordings of President Michel Temer discussing a bribe for Eduardo Cunha, imprisoned on a nine-year sentence for corruption, money laundering and tax evasion in return for not talking to prosecutors. Temer strongly denied the report.
May 18 – Police searched the Rio de Janeiro apartment of Aécio Neves, who narrowly lost the 2014 presidential election to Dilma Rousseff in the second-round runoff. The Supreme Court, which has jurisdiction in criminal trials of sitting politicians, suspended Neves'senatorial status pending a criminal trial. An Odebrecht executive seeking a lighter sentence on his own bribery charges filmed Nueves discussing a payment of two million reis, roughly $638,000.
May 19
The Supreme Federal Court released a plea bargain testimony from JBS S.A., revealing that the company paid 500 million reais in bribes to politicians, including current President Michel Temer and his predecessors Dilma Rousseff and Luiz Inácio Lula da Silva.
Protesters demand new elections after the release of an audio tape in which Temer appears to approve a hush money payment to Eduardo Cunha.
May 24 – Protestors set fire to the Ministry of Agriculture headquarters in Brasília amid calls for the impeachment or resignation of Michel Temer as President of Brazil over allegations of corruption.

June
June 6 – Superior Electoral Court (TSE) reopened the illegal campaign funding case against President Michel Temer, the vice presidential candidate on former President Dilma Rousseff's ticket in 2014. Temer became president in August 2016 when Rousseff was impeached, and could be unseated if the court annuls the Rousseff–Temer election victory.
June 7 - TSE heard a motion on the admissibility of new allegations made in plea bargain testimony by construction company Odebrecht about illegal campaign contributions to the political ticket shared by then-president Dilma Rousseff and then-vice president Michel Temer, who replaced her after her impeachment.
June 9
TSE votes 4–3 to reject campaign finance case against Temer which had also implicated Rousseff as his running mate.
June 13 - Sergio Cabral Filho, governor of the state of Rio de Janeiro 2007-2014, was sentenced to 14 years and two months in prison for corruption and money laundering in a scheme involving kickbacks for construction contracts such as a Rio petrochemical plant. Former Rio interior minister Wilson Carlos Carvalho, described as Cabral's right hand, was also found guilty and sentenced to ten years. Judge Sérgio Moro said there was not enough evidence to convict Cabral's wife, Adriana Ancelmo.
June 21
reports surfaced  of a Temer administration plan to lift restrictions on foreign mining company operations within a 150-mile zone of the country's border.
DataPoder puts Temer approval rating at 2%.
June 27 
President Michel Temer is charged with corruption by Prosecutor General Rodrigo Janot. The case eventually went to the Supreme Federal Court.
A federal court upholds João Vaccari Neto's appeal of his 15-year sentence for bribery and money laundering.
June 29 - Ipsos Institute poll puts Temer disapproval rating at 93%.

July
July 4 - Temer's government introduces a legislative initiative described as labor reform.
July 11 -Temer signs MP 759 into law, making significant changes to Brazilian land and agrarian reform policies that environmentalists say threaten to worsen deforestation and a massive asset transfer to large landowners.
July 12 – Judge Sérgio Moro sentences former Brazilian president Luiz Inácio Lula da Silva after finding him guilty on corruption and money laundering charges in connection with the Petrobras investigation. Lula, who remains free on appeal, is  sentenced to nine and a half years in prison.
July 25 - Temer appointed  minister of culture.
July 27 - Transparency NGO Contas Abertas (Open Accounts) said Temer had spent 4.2 billion reais ($1.33 billion) since June, compared to 100 million reais in January through May, in advance of a vote in the lower house on corruption charges that could remove him from office.

August 
August 3 –  In association football, Paris Saint-Germain sign Neymar from FC Barcelona for a world-record transfer fee of €222 million (£200 million, US$264 million).
August 6 - Police and soldiers raid five poor suburbs of Rio de Janeiro looking for those responsible for a string of truck hijackings.
 August 11
Sérgio Côrtes, former Secretary of Health in Rio de Janeiro state, said in court that $3 million US had been deposited for his use in a Swiss bank account in connection with an overbilling scheme involving protheses at a Rio trauma center.
Petrobras discovered "oil accumulation in the Campos basin's pre-salt layer, in the area of Marlim Sul field."
August 16 - Justice Minister Torquato Jardim said at a conference that Brazil's informal economy accounted for 16% of its gross domestic product.
August 21 – Temer government announces plans to privatize Electrobras, the Petrobras subsidiary that produces 40% of Brazil's electricity.
August 22 – The passenger ship Comandante Ribeiro sinks in the Xingu River near Porto de Moz with the loss of at least ten lives.
August 23 - News emerged that Michel Temer had abolished the protected status of a huge piece of land in the remote northern Amazon known as the National Reserve of Copper and Associates (Renca).
August 25 – President Michel Temer abolishes the 46,000 km2 National Reserve of Copper and Associates (Renca) ecological reserve, which spans the borders of Amapá and Pará states in northern Brazil. More than 20 domestic and multinational firms have expressed an interest in accessing the area's deposits of gold, copper, tantalum, iron ore, nickel and manganese.
August 29 - issued an injunction against the revocation of Renca, saying that Michel Temer had exceeded his authority and that the area's ecological protections could only be undertaken by the legislative branch.

September 
September 6 - Prosecutors file corruption charges in connection with Operation Carwash against ex-presidents Dilma Rousseff and Luiz Inacio Lula da Silva, better known as Lula. It was the first time allegations had been made against Rousseff. Lula had previously been charged in connection with a beach house that prosecutors say was a bribe.
September 8 – Prosecutor Rodrigo Janot files charges in the Supreme Court against  officials in President Michel Temer's Brazilian Democratic Movement Party accusing them of  forming a criminal organization.
September 10 - Fundação Nacional do Índio (Funai), the Brazilian agency for indigenous people, charged that a group of miners had boasted of killing as many as ten members of an uncontacted tribe.
September 11
Authorities investigated the reported murder of ten members of an Amazonian tribe in the Javari Valley.
Brazilian prosecutors announced a joint investigation with Venezuela of a scheme in which Venezuelan government agency PDVSA overpaid for agricultural equipment from Brazil's America Trading by $64 million. Investigators said that most of the payments wound up in accounts in Panama, Switzerland and the United States.
September 15 - Additional corruption charges are filed against Michel Temer in relation to illegal campaign contributions from JBS S.A.
September 16 - Brazil imposed a 20% tariff on imports of US ethanol.
September 28 - Brazil auctions oil leases, raising more than one billion dollars.

October 
October 4 – Brazilian police detain fugitive Italian former left-wing guerrilla and convicted murderer Cesare Battisti, as he was attempting to flee across the border into Bolivia to avoid extradition back to Italy and face his life sentence prison term for four murders in the 1970s.
October 5 – In the town of Janaúba, Minas Gerais state, a recently dismissed security guard set fire to a childcare center killing ten children and three teachers, and leaving, mostly children aged four and five, injured.
October 18 - The Tribunal de Contas da União (Federal Accounting Court) said Brazilian Development Bank (BNDES) paid 20% too much for shares it bought of JBS S.A. from Joseley and Wesley Batista, causing an $89 million loss.
October 26 – Brazil's Chamber of Deputies voted 233–251 on a motion to approve impeachment proceedings against President Michel Temer. The motion required a two-thirds majority (342 votes) to proceed. Brazilian law requires Chamber of Deputies approval of a Supreme Court trial; criminal charges cannot be brought against a sitting president under Brazilian law.
October 27 – Brazil auctions offshore oil leases to Exxon Mobil, Statoil and Royal Dutch Shell.

November 
 November 12 - The Brazilian Grand Prix takes place at the Autódromo José Carlos Pace in the Interlagos neighborhood of São Paulo. the race is won by Sebastian Vettel and is the final home race for Brazilian Felipe Massa.
 November 21 - Temer signs immigration bill into law.
 November 29 - National Institute for Space Research (INPE) said deforestation increased 29% that year, on top of a 24% increase the year before.
 November 30 - Supreme Court upholds ban on the use of asbestos in Brazil.

December 
 Standard and Poor's reduces Brazil's credit rating from BB to BB−.
 December 6 - Alleged Rio de Janeiro drug lord Avelino da Silva, known as Rogério 157, arrested in Arará following more than 20 deaths and 14 injuries in Rocinha.
 December 12
the Brazilian Social Democracy Party (PSDB) selected Geraldo Alckmin as its presidential candidate in the upcoming 2018 general election.
Charges were filed in the 10th Federal Court in Brasilia against  of accepting a bribe as an aide to Michel Temer. Rocha Loures had been filmed leaving a São Paulo pizzeria with a bag containing 500,000 reis which was, according to prosecutors, supposed to be a down payment on a R38 million to be paid over nine months. Temer had been charged as well but the Chamber of Deputies voted against allowing the Supreme Court to try the charge. Prosecution of Temer on that charge thereupon could not proceed until he left office. This filing represented a move forward in a criminal case against Rocha Lourdes. 
 December 15 - Ecudadorean vice-president Jorge Glas was sentenced to six years in prison for taking $13.5 million from Brazilian conglomerate Odebrecht.
 December 19 - Marcelo Odebrecht released from prison after two and a half years. Seven years of his reduced sentence remained but he'd been greenlighted to serve the remainder of his sentence at his luxury home in São Paulo. Originally sentenced to 9 years, Odebrecht's sentence was reduced in return for his cooperation in Operation Car Wash.
 December 28 - Brazilian Supreme Court chief justice Cármen Lúcia upheld the appeal of chief prosecutor Raquel Dodge against Temer's Christmas pardon, which he had expanded to cover first offenders with convictions for non-violent crimes who had served at least one fifth of their sentence. Corncerns had been expressed that the change was intended to benefit politicians convicted under the Operation Car Wash investigation.

Arts and culture 
2016–17 Brazil network television schedule
List of Brazilian films of 2017

Sports 
2017 in Brazilian football

Deaths
 January 3 – Vida Alves, 88, actress, multiple organ failure.
 January 19 – Loalwa Braz, 63, singer-songwriter ("Lambada").
 January 19 – Teori Zavascki, 68, Supreme Court judge, Operação Lava Jato reporter, plane crash.
 January 20 – , 69, sertanejo composer, pneumonia.
 January 20 – Carlos Alberto Silva, 77, football manager (Guarani, Porto, Corinthians, Deportivo La Coruña, Brazil national football team).
 February 1 – Albano Bortoletto Cavallin, 86, Roman Catholic prelate, Bishop of Guarapuava (1986–1992) and Archbishop of Londrina (1992–2006), surgical complications.
 February 3 – Marisa Letícia Lula da Silva, 66, trade unionist, First Lady (2003–2010), stroke.
 February 11 – Fab Melo, 26, professional basketball player (Boston Celtics).
 February 13 – Paulo Henrique Filho, 52,  footballer.
 February 15 – , 73, musician and composer.
 February 28 – Antônio Ribeiro de Oliveira, 90, Roman Catholic prelate, Bishop of Ipameri (1975–1985) and Archbishop of Goiânia (1985–2002).
 March 3 – , 91, businessman.
 March 10 – , 99, politician.
 March 25 – Marcelo Pinto Carvalheira, 88, Roman Catholic prelate, Bishop of Guarabira (1981–1989), Archbishop of Paraíba (1995–2004).
 March 29 – João Gilberto Noll, 70, writer.
 April 4 – Clóvis Frainer, 86, Roman Catholic prelate, Archbishop of Manaus (1985–1991) and Juiz de Fora (1991–2001).
 April 6 – Bona Medeiros, 86, politician, Governor of Piauí (1986–1987).
 April 6 – Newton Holanda Gurgel, 93, Roman Catholic prelate, Bishop of Crato (1993–2001).
 April 23 – Jerry Adriani, 70, singer and actor, cancer.
 April 30 – Belchior, 70, singer and composer.
 May 2 – Eduardo Portella, 84, essayist, author and politician, Minister of Education (1979–1980).
 May 3 – Sônia Bogner, 66, Brazilian-born German fashion designer.
 May 5 – Almir Guineto, 70, sambista, kidney disease and diabetes.
 May 7 – Elon Lages Lima, 87, mathematician.
 May 10 – Nelson Xavier, 75, actor (The Guns, A Queda), lung disease.
 May 12 – Antonio Candido, 98, literary critic and sociologist.
 May 19 – Kid Vinil, 62, musician and record producer.
 May 23 – , 78, guitarist and composer.
 June 12 – Pessalli, 26, footballer (Grêmio, Angers, Paraná), traffic collision.
 June 13 – José Odon Maia Alencar, 88, politician, Governor of Piauí (1966), Mayor of Pio IX (1959–1962).
 June 15 – Wilma de Faria, 72, politician, governor of Rio Grande do Norte (2003–2010), cancer.
 June 16 – Eliza Clívia, 37, singer, traffic collision.
 June 27 – João Oneres Marchiori, 84, Roman Catholic prelate, Bishop of Caçador (1977–1983) and Lages (1987–2009).
 July 3 – Ângelo Angelin, 82, politician, Governor of Rondônia (1985–1987).
 July 4 – Maria d'Apparecida, 91, opera singer.
 July 7 – Johnson Kendrick, 25, footballer (Al-Gharafa), shot.
 July 10 – Elvira Vigna, 69, writer, cancer.
 July 20 – Marco Aurélio Garcia, 76, politician, heart attack.
 July 23 – Waldir Peres, 66, footballer (São Paulo, national team), world championship bronze medalist (1978), heart attack.
 July 24 – Domingo Alzugaray, 84, Argentine-born Brazilian actor and journalist, founder of ISTOÉ, complications of Alzheimer's disease.
 July 26 – Maxlei dos Santos Luzia, 42, footballer (Botafogo, AA Portuguesa, Vila Nova), cerebral edema.
 July 27 – Perivaldo Dantas, 64, footballer (national team, Botafogo, São Paulo Futebol Clube), pneumonia.
 July 29 – José Osvaldo de Meira Penna, 100, diplomat and writer.
 August 4 – Luiz Melodia, 66, actor, singer and songwriter, bone marrow cancer.
 August 5 – Ralph Biasi, 69, politician, Mayor of Americana (1973–1977) and Minister for Science and Technology (1988–1989).
 August 11 – Luiz Vicente Bernetti, 83, Italian-born Brazilian Roman Catholic prelate, Bishop of Apucarana (2005–2009).
 August 12 – , 79, politician and lawyer.
 August 17 – Paulo Silvino, 78, actor and humorist (A Praça É Nossa, Zorra Total), stomach cancer.
 August 22 – , 80, football commentator, pneumonia.
 August 22 – Pedro Pedrossian, 89, politician, Governor of Mato Grosso (1966–1971) and Mato Grosso do Sul (1980–1983, 1991–1995).
 August 24 – , 63, footballer, cancer.
 August 26 – Wilson das Neves, 81, percussionist and singer, cancer.
 August 27 – José Maria Pires, 98, Roman Catholic prelate, Bishop of Araçuaí (1957–1965) and Archbishop of Paraíba (1965–1995), pneumonia.
 September 4 – , 74, actress and drag queen, septic shock.
 September 15 – Izidoro Kosinski, 85, Roman Catholic prelate, Bishop of Três Lagoas (1981–2009).
 September 16 – Marcelo Rezende, 65, journalist and television presenter, complications from pancreatic and liver cancer.
 September 17 – Laudir de Oliveira, 77, percussionist (Sérgio Mendes, Marcos Valle, Chicago) and producer.
 September 22 – Elizete da Silva, 46, heptathlete, South American champion (2001, 2005, 2006), traffic collision.
 October 5 – Heley de Abreu Silva Batista, 43, teacher (Janaúba Tragedy), burns.
 October 5 – Ruth Escobar, 81, Portuguese-born Brazilian actress (The Jew) and politician, founder of Teatro Ruth Escobar.
 October 8 – Michel Fernando Costa, 36, footballer (SK Slavia Prague), leukemia.
 October 11 – Nélio José Nicolai, 77, electrotechnician, inventor of Caller ID.
 October 22 – 
Ângela Lago, 71, writer and illustrator.
Geraldo João Paulo Roger Verdier, 80, French-born Brazilian Roman Catholic prelate, Bishop of Guajará-Mirim (1980–2011), hemorrhagic stroke.
 November 4 – Tallys, 30, footballer (Paysandu), traffic collision.
 November 5 – Dionatan Teixeira, 25, Brazilian-born Slovak footballer (Košice, Stoke City), heart attack.
 November 7 – Amelia Toledo, 90, sculptor and painter.
 November 10 – Moniz Bandeira, 81, political scientist, historian and poet.
 November 10 – Márcia Cabrita, 53, actress (Sai de Baixo, Sete Pecados, Novo Mundo), ovarian cancer.
 November 15 – Frans Krajcberg, 96, Polish-born Brazilian artist.
 November 26 – José Doth de Oliveira, 79, Roman Catholic prelate, Bishop of Iguatu (2000–2009), complications from Alzheimer's disease.
 November 30 – , 65, actress (Quatro por Quatro, Zazá, Jamais Te Esquecerei), breast cancer.
 December 3 – , 52, singer and guitarist, cancer.
 December 3 – , 88, socialite.
 December 5 – Victor Fontana, 101, politician, Vice-Governor of Santa Catarina (1983–1987).
 December 7 – , 57, Brazilian basketball player, lymphoma.
 December 8 – Ocimar Versolato, 56, Brazilian fashion designer, aneurysm following a stroke.
 December 9 – , 79, Brazilian philosopher, writer and journalist, multiple organ failure.
 December 10 – Eva Todor, 98, Hungarian-born Brazilian actress, pneumonia.
 December 19 – Vinalto Graf, 78, Brazilian zoologist.
 December 21 – Francelino Pereira, 96, Brazilian politician, Senator (1995–2003), Governor of Minas Gerais (1979–1983), and Deputy (1963–1979).
 December 21 – Renan Martins Pereira, 20, Brazilian footballer (Avaí), brain cancer.

See also

References

 
2010s in Brazil
Brazil
Brazil
Years of the 21st century in Brazil